

References

Supplemental references used for chart
J. Robinson, J. Harding and J. Vouillamoz Wine Grapes - A complete guide to 1,368 vine varieties, including their origins and flavours pgs XXVIII-XXX Allen Lane 2012 

Italian wine

Wine-related lists
Grape